Joshua Bartholomew (born July 30, 1984), known mononymously as Bartholomew, is a Canadian singer-songwriter, multi-instrumentalist, and producer. He writes and records music with his wife Lisa Harriton under the moniker JoLi. Bartholomew is a co-writer and producer of the Grammy and Oscar nominated song "Everything Is Awesome" from The Lego Movie.

Early life
Bartholomew was born in Pembroke, Ontario, and raised on military bases throughout Canada including CFB Petawawa, CFB Valcartier and CFB Borden. Bartholomew began singing at the age of three and cites his parents' extensive record collection as an early influence.

While attending Banting Memorial High School he was given permission to take co-op classes in his home studio where he began recording demos of his songs for school credit, playing all instruments himself. This role remains on most of Bartholomew's studio recordings.

Music career
Bartholomew's self-titled debut EP was released in 2005. Two songs "What Happened To Our Love" and "IT" gained nationwide radio play on CBC Radio One.  
 CBC Radio One producer Kai Black, CBC host Brent Bambury, singer-songwriter Ron Sexsmith and Relient K's Matt Thiessen were among early supporters. In 2006, Bartholomew won  
 the songwriting contest held by Toronto's No. 1 Pop/AC radio station MIX 99.9 FM (CKFM-FM) and toured with Randy Bachman and Burton Cummings. Several labels responded favourably to his debut, but Bartholomew opted to forego a major label deal.

Bartholomew travelled extensively throughout 2006 to 2008 spending extended periods of time in New York City, Los Angeles and Nashville. Most of 2009 and 2010 was spent living in his Airstream trailer in Nashville, writing songs with pop and country artists including Grammy nominated country band Emerson Drive.

In 2008 Bartholomew self-released his first full length record, And So It Begins, a double album with 20 songs to critical acclaim, followed by Heart Headed, a 4 song EP released as a digital download in 2009.

In January 2011, in a video posted on his official website, Bartholomew stated his new record "is a little heavier than what you're used to hearing" and that he had begun working on his new album with several collaborators including: Dave Kushner (Velvet Revolver), Chris Thorn (Blind Melon), Warren Huart (Aerosmith) and Billy Mohler (Smashing Pumpkins). He also announced he was shortening his name from Joshua Bartholomew to Bartholomew. On January 25, 2011, the Joshua Bartholomew Facebook fan page changed to Bartholomew.

Musical style and influence 
Bartholomew is a self-professed Beatles and Led Zeppelin fanatic and has cited Magical Mystery Tour and Led Zeppelin as his favorite albums. In 2006, Bartholomew opened for two of his musical heroes Ron Sexsmith and Bachman-Cummings.

Bartholomew states that The Beatles played a major part in his childhood and considers them to be "the greatest band of all time." Bartholomew has also named producer, Dave Sardy as his most important modern production influence.

Film and television 
In 2013, Bartholomew was cast as musician "Moocher" in Cinnamon Girl: California Dreamin', an original drama series set in the 1960s Laurel Canyon music scene, but the Lifetime network passed on the pilot.

Discography

Awards and nominations

"Everything Is Awesome" awards and nominations
Nominated for Best Original Song at the 87th Academy Awards 
Nominated for a Grammy Award for Best Song Written for Visual Media
Nominated for a Critics' Choice Movie Award for Best Song
Nominated for a 2014 Georgia Film Critics Association for Best Original Song
Nominated for a Satellite Award for Best Original Song 
Nominated for an Awards Circuit Community Award Best Original Song 
 2014 Denver Film Critics Society for Best Original Song
2014 Hollywood Music in Media Award for Song – Animated Film
2014 Houston Film Critics Society for Best Original Song
2014 Iowa Film Critics for Best Original Song
2014 Phoenix Film Critics Society Awards for Best Original Song
2015 Talk Film Society Awards for Best Original Song
Variety Artisans Award

References

External links
  (Bartholomew)
 Official Twitter
 

1984 births
Living people
21st-century Canadian multi-instrumentalists
Canadian record producers
Canadian rock singers
Canadian singer-songwriters
21st-century Canadian composers
21st-century Canadian guitarists
21st-century Canadian drummers
21st-century Canadian pianists
Canadian rock guitarists
Canadian pop guitarists
Canadian male guitarists
21st-century Canadian bass guitarists
Canadian rock bass guitarists
Canadian rock drummers
Canadian pop drummers
Canadian pop singers
Canadian percussionists
Canadian male pianists
Male bass guitarists
21st-century Canadian male singers
Musicians from Ontario
People from Pembroke, Ontario
Canadian male singer-songwriters